Monodonta labio, common name the toothed top shell or the lipped periwinkle, is a species of sea snail, a marine gastropod mollusk in the family Trochidae, the top snails.

Distribution
This species occurs in the Indian Ocean off Madagascar and the Mascarene basin and in the Western Pacific and off the Philippines and commonly seen in Hong Kong near tide line.

Description
The length of the shell size varies between 15 mm and 45 mm. The shell is heavy and coarse with rough, grained surface with moderate sutures between rounded whorls. The body whorl is swollen and the penultimate whorl somewhat less. The shell shows a rounded keel (a spiral ridge marking a change of slope) and an umbilicus sealed with a callus. The apex is often worn away in adults. The columella has a prominent, blunt tooth. The inner edge of the outer lip shows a number of smaller knobs. The aperture has a nacreous interior. The color of the shell varies from a dark reddish brown to pale brown, with spiraled dashes of cream or pink.

Distribution
This marine species occurs over a wide range in Central and East Indian Ocean, Indo-China, Indo-Malaysian Oceania, the Philippines; the Persian Gulf, West Indian Ocean to Micronesia, Western Pacific, Micronesia and Australia (Northern Territory, Queensland, Western Australia)

Habitat
This snail lives on or under rocks and coral in the lower intertidal zone. But it tolerates a wide variety of substrata.

Feeding habits
This species is a herbivorous snail grazing on microalgae

References
Notes

Bibliography
 Linnaeus, C. 1758. Systemae naturae per regna tria naturae, secundum classes, ordines, genera, species, cum characteribus, differetiis, synonymis, locis.v. Holmiae : Laurentii Salvii 824 pp
 Adams, A. 1853. Contributions towards a monograph of the Trochidae, a family of gastropodous Mollusca. Proceedings of the Zoological Society of London 1851(19): 150–192 
 Melvill, J.C. & Standen, R. 1901. The Mollusca of the Persian Gulf, Gulf of Oman, and the Arabian Sea, as evidenced mainly through the collections of Mr. F.W. Townsend, 1893–1900; with descriptions of new species. Proceedings of the Zoological Society of London 1901(ii): 327–460 pls xxi–xxiv
 Dautzenberg, P. & Fischer, H. 1905. Liste des mollusques récoltés par M. le Capitaine de Frégate Blaise au Tonkin et description d'espèces nouvelles. Journal de Conchyliologie 53: 85–234
 Schepman, M.M. 1908. Prosobranchia (excluding Heteropoda and parasitic Prosobranchia). Rhipidoglossa and Docoglossa. With an appendix by Prof. R. Bergh
 Allan, J.K. 1950. Australian Shells: with related animals living in the sea, in freshwater and on the land. Melbourne : Georgian House xix, 470 pp., 45 pls, 112 text figs.
 Demond, J. 1957. Micronesian reef associated gastropods. Pacific Science 11(3): 275–341, fig. 2, pl. 1
 Tantanasiriwong, R. 1978. An illustrated checklist of marine shelled gastropods from Phuket Island, adjacent mainland and offshore islands, Western Peninsula, Thailand. Phuket Marine Biological Center, Research Bulletin 21: 1–22, 259
 Short, J.W. & Potter, D.G. 1987. Shells of Queensland and The Great Barrier Reef. Drummoyne, NSW : Golden press Pty Ltd 135 pp., 60 pl.
 Drivas, J. & M. Jay (1988). Coquillages de La Réunion et de l'île Maurice
 Hickman, C.S. & McLean, J.H. 1990. Systematic revision and suprageneric classification of trochacean gastropods. Natural History Museum of Los Angeles County. Science Series 35: i–vi, 1–169 
 Wilson, B. 1993. Australian Marine Shells. Prosobranch Gastropods. Kallaroo, Western Australia : Odyssey Publishing Vol. 1 408 pp
 Donald K.M., Kennedy M. & Spencer H.G. (2005) The phylogeny and taxonomy of austral monodontine topshells (Mollusca: Gastropoda: Trochidae), inferred from DNA sequences. Molecular Phylogenetics and Evolution 37: 474–483
 Wilson, B. 2002. A Handbook to Australian Seashells on Seashores East to West and North to South. Sydney : Reed New Holland 185 pp.
 Poppe G.T., Tagaro S.P. & Dekker H. (2006) The Seguenziidae, Chilodontidae, Trochidae, Calliostomatidae and Solariellidae of the Philippine Islands. Visaya Supplement 2: 1–228. page(s): 95
 Carkill M. et al (2010) Age and Size Distribution of Monodonta lineata on North Clare Shores. BT Young Scientist Awards 2010.

External links

 

labio
Gastropods described in 1758
Taxa named by Carl Linnaeus